Vincent Wulf (born 5 January 1973) is a former France international rugby league footballer who represented France at the 2000 World Cup.

Playing career
A Marist Saints representative in the Auckland Rugby League competition, Wulf first moved to France in 1996 to join the Paris Saint-Germain Rugby League club. The club was dissolved at the end of the 1997 season and Wulf moved to join the Villeneuve Leopards in the French championship.

In 2000, Wulf was picked for the French squad for the 2000 World Cup where he played in four matches. Wulf also toured New Zealand and Papua New Guinea in 2001 with the French side.

Personal life
Wulf is part of a sporting family, being related to Auckland Rugby Union representative Eddie and All Blacks representative Rudi.

He is of German-Samoan origin.

References

1973 births
Living people
New Zealand rugby league players
France national rugby league team players
Marist Saints players
New Zealand people of German descent
New Zealand sportspeople of Samoan descent
Paris Saint-Germain Rugby League players
New Zealand emigrants to France
French rugby league coaches
Rugby league hookers
Rugby league second-rows
Villeneuve Leopards coaches
Villeneuve Leopards players